Mojave High School, is a nine-month public high school that is part of Clark County School District located in North Las Vegas, Nevada. After a year of sharing a campus at Cheyenne High School on a "double session" schedule where Cheyenne students attended from 6 am to 12 pm and Mojave students attended 1 pm to 7 pm (while Mojave was under construction), the inaugural class, class of 2000, were the only class to not have an upper-class. The school began with only the Freshman class, who became the first graduating class in 2000.

Athletics
Mojave High School offers many different athletic teams including football, baseball, softball, soccer, swimming, tennis, golf, cross-country, wrestling, basketball, bowling, cheerleading, dance, and volleyball. They compete in the Sunset 3A Region of the Nevada Interscholastic Activities Association.

Notable alumni
 Sequoia Holmes, basketballer in the WNBA
 Ronnie Radke, singer
 Max 
Green, bassist

References

External links

Clark County School District
Educational institutions established in 1996
High schools in Clark County, Nevada
Buildings and structures in North Las Vegas, Nevada
1996 establishments in Nevada
Public high schools in Nevada